The Lake Shore Electric Railway (LSE) was an interurban electric railway that ran primarily between Cleveland and Toledo, Ohio by way of Sandusky and Fremont. Through arrangements with connecting interurban lines, it also offered service from Fremont to Fostoria and Lima, Ohio, and at Toledo to Detroit and Cincinnati.

History 
The LSE was formed in 1901 and was composed of four predecessor street car and interurban lines. All were owned by the Everett-Moore Syndicate. Operations under the Lake Shore Electric name operated a 60-mile route between Cleveland and Toledo. In 1907, the company constructed a cutoff between Sandusky and Fremont, Ohio, which reduced the distance between Cleveland and Toledo by five miles and 30 minutes. The old and the new routes were operated with hourly passenger service where a two car interurban from Cleveland separated at Sandusky and met and recoupled at Fremont to continue to Toledo. This service continued to 1939.

Business for the LSE was good until the mid 1920s, as it was as for most interurbans. Roads were mostly unpaved, very muddy or dusty, and cartage and passenger transportation was horse drawn and slow. Around 1925, the states began paving highways, the counties began paving rural roads, the cities began paving streets, and inexpensive cars began to be produced in growing numbers. Business for interurbans began to drop as a result, and by 1930 many interurbans had stopped operating. The LSE barely remained in business, but to make matters worse, the economic collapse of the Great Depression was underway.

Starting around 1930, the LSE established a productive and growing freight business with neighboring interurban Cincinnati and Lake Erie RR. Together, the two traction lines with their connection at Toledo provided overnight delivery from the approximately 300 miles between Cincinnati and Cleveland. Steam railroads were unable to provide such fast service by a matter of days. At Toledo in 1936, 17,000 pounds of freight passed between the two lines according to the CEO of the C&LE(See Wikipedia regarding the C&LE). Although barely profitable, the resulting freight business generated income allowing the two lines to survive and keeping its employees working. However, the deepening Great Depression further reduced this freight business, and the LSE declared bankruptcy in 1933. Operations continued under the direction of a court-appointed bankruptcy receiver. In 1937, LSE freight-service employees went on strike, and the LSE Receiver terminated freight operations that same day.  The next year, the railroad abandoned all operations which were now passenger only. This also affected the Toledo connecting C&LE with the loss of freight business to Cleveland, and the C&LE abandoned in 1939.

Operations

The Lake Shore Electric at its height offered multiple-unit trains of interurban cars to and from Cleveland and Toledo on a train per hour schedule.  These trains would split in Fremont on the west and at Ceylon Junction (a passenger station on the former S&I line east of Huron at the connection with the former TF&N branch to Norwalk) on the east.  After splitting, some cars would travel via the Huron, Sandusky and Castalia northern route and others would go via the Norwalk, Monroeville, Bellevue, and Clyde southern route.  The service was scheduled so the cars would re-join at Fremont and Ceylon Junction, respectively, to continue on to their destinations of Toledo or Cleveland as a train.

The Lake Shore Electric achieved nationwide notoriety through the heroism of a motorman, William Lang, who climbed out of his moving trolley car and snatched a 22-month-old child off the tracks on August 24, 1932, near Lorain, Ohio.  The young girl, Leila Jean Smith, grew to adulthood and they remained friends for the rest of his life.

Lake Shore Electric went into bankruptcy on October 5, 1932. It  continued operation under court ordered receivership thereafter until abandonment. As its passenger business waned with the increasing number of private automobiles on paved roads and the effects of the Depression, it outlasted most connecting interurban lines by concentrating on freight business. LSE had developed a marginally profitable freight service interchanging with the Cincinnati and Lake Erie Railroad at Toledo to deliver less-than-carload (LCL) freight from southern Ohio factories to Cleveland. The C&LE traction freights continued straight through Toledo to Cleveland on LSE trackage on a tight overnight schedule providing next day delivery that competing steam railroads could not equal by at last two days.  LSE also introduced an early intermodal service called the "Railwagon," that would enable truck trailers to load on a specially designed flatcar without the need for a loading ramp or crane.  Bureaucratic delays by Ohio motor carrier regulators doomed the service.

A poorly planned strike by LSE freight agents and office staff in 1938 caused the LSE Receiver to immediately abandon the business. This put every LSE employee out of work at the worst time in the Great Depression. A brief article in the Cleveland newspaper noted that 150 interurban employees would lose their jobs. The loss of the Cleveland connection seriously hurt the C&LE leading it to bankruptcy in 1939 and similarly the nearby Indiana Railroad interurban the next year for the same reason.  The LSE ended all interurban rail operations on May 15, 1938. Car #167 made the last run from Cleveland.

Surviving remnants 

Several physical remnants of the Lake Shore Electric can still be found today.  In the cities of Bay Village and Avon Lake are streets named "Electric," running over the former right-of-way.  Also, bridge piers can be found at the Cleveland Metroparks Huntington Reservation and in Rose Hill Park, both in Bay Village, and at several other locations.  Some former LSE structures remain standing, and have been converted to other uses.  Much of its route can still be traced in northern Ohio by power lines on unusually high utility poles, where LSE's former electrical transmission infrastructure became the property of area utility companies.

Existing equipment 
As of 2009, LSE coach #167 (that made the last run in 1938) sits at the LSRA station Site at Wellington, Ohio, south of Lorain. Along with other railroad relics, it sits in the unprotected in the open, despite this it is in surprisingly good shape. #167 is a 1915 Jewett Car Co. steel coach with Baldwin MCB trucks. In 1996 LSE167 appeared at the Centennial celebration for the Steel Plant in Lorain as the icon for the original Johnson Steel Company, producers of Jaybird streetcar rail.  The Northern Ohio Railway Museum (NORM) in Chippewa Lake, Ohio has several pieces of LSE rolling stock preserved, including Lake Shore Electric wood Coach #149 (1927 Niles); wood Coach #151 (1906 Niles) and steel Coach #181 (1918 Jewett).  Freight equipment includes wood Freight Motor #42 (1908 Niles) and wood Freight Trailer #464 (home-built by LSE in 1919).  NORM also has an original Lorain Street Railway wood City Car #83, a line that was later operated by the Lake Shore Electric. In addition, wooden coach #150 (1906 Niles) and wood interurban box car #810 (1924 Kuhlman) are on trucks and undergoing restoration at Illinois Railway Museum as of February 15, 2010.  LSE steel coach #174 (1918 Jewett) is preserved as a static exhibit at The Works in Newark, Ohio. Car #38 is parked in the Avon Lake Shopping Center, located on Lake Road, very near Electric Blvd.

See also 
 Northern Ohio Railway Museum
 Ohio Electric Railway

Footnotes

References

External links 
 Images of Lake Shore Electric equipment at Dave's Electric Railroads
 Lake Shore Rail Maps, including historical background and photographs

Defunct Ohio railroads
Defunct Michigan railroads
Interurban railways in Ohio
Interurban railways in Michigan
Railway lines opened in 1901